Glory of Love is an album by flautist Herbie Mann released on the CTI label featuring performances recorded at Rudy Van Gelder's studio in 1967.

Reception
The Allmusic review by Scott Yanow awarded the album 2 stars stating "the most interesting aspect of the R&B-oriented date is that the up-and-coming flutist Hubert Laws is matched with Mann on several tracks".

Track listing
All compositions by Herbie Mann except as indicated
 "No Use Crying" (Roy Gaines, Freddie Lee Kober, J. B. Daniels) - 3:03   
 "Hold On, I'm Comin'" (Isaac Hayes, David Porter) - 3:12
 "Glory of Love" (Billy Hill) - 2:42   
 "Unchain My Heart" (Robert Sharp, Jr., Teddy Powell) - 3:12   
 "House of the Rising Sun" (Traditional) - 3:10   
 "The Letter" (Wayne Carson) - 3:25   
 "Upa, Neguinho" (Edu Lobo, Gianfrancesco Guanieri) - 2:39   
 "Love Is Stronger Far Than We" (Pierre Barouh, Jerry Keller, Francis Lai) -  3:11   
 "Oh, How I Want To Love You" - 5:32   
 "In and Out" - 4:34  
Recorded at Van Gelder Studio in Englewood Cliffs, New Jersey on July 26 (tracks 1, 3-6, 8 & 9), July 27 (track 10), September 19 (track 7) and October 6 (track 2), 1967

Personnel
Herbie Mann - flute, arranger, conductor
Hubert Laws - flute, piccolo
Ernie Royal, Burt Collins - trumpet, flugelhorn
Benny Powell - trombone
Joseph Grimaldi - saxophone
Leroy Glover - piano, organ, arranger, conductor
Paul Griffin - piano
Roland Hanna - organ
Jay Berliner, Eric Gale - guitar
Ron Carter - bass
Herb Lovelle, Grady Tate - drums
Teddy Sommer - vibraphone, percussion 
Ray Barretto, Johnny Pacheco - percussion
Herb Bernstein - arranger, conductor
Earl May - bass
Roy Ayers - vibes
Technical
Rudy Van Gelder - engineer
Sam Antupit - album design
Pete Turner - photography

References

1968 albums
CTI Records albums
Herbie Mann albums
Albums arranged by Herb Bernstein
Albums produced by Creed Taylor
Albums recorded at Van Gelder Studio